Princess Noor bint Asem (born 6 October 1982) is a member of the Jordanian Royal Family.

Family

Her father is Prince Asem bin Al Nayef, a grandson of King Abdullah I of Jordan and her mother is Firouzeh Vokhshouri. Her mother lives in Madrid, Spain, where she is an attaché for the Jordanian Embassy.

Princess Noor's parents divorced in 1985 and in 1986 her father married Princess Sana Asem.

Education
Having studied her IGCSE's and A Levels at Kings College, Madrid, Spain, she then went on to graduate with a bachelor's degree in Political Communication from Emerson College in 2004, then a master's degree in Positive Leadership and Strategy in 2016 from IE Business School of Behavior and Social Sciences, Madrid.

Marriages
On 29 August 2003, the Royal Jordanian Court announced Princess Noor's marriage to Prince Hamzah bin Hussein, her second cousin, had taken place. The marriage ceremony was held at al-Baraka Palace in Amman. The celebration of the marriage (Zifaf) was held on 27 May 2004 at Zahran Palace in Amman. The marriage produced one daughter, Princess Haya bint Hamzah (born 18 April 2007).

The couple  divorced on 9 September 2009, although the divorce was not confirmed by the Royal Jordanian Court until an announcement in March 2010. Thereafter, Princess Noor reverted to the use of her maiden name Princess Noor bint Asem.

In March 2018, Princess Noor officially announced her engagement to Saudi businessman and horse breeder Amr Zedan, the future owner of the disqualified 2021 Kentucky Derby winner, Medina Spirit. The couple were married at the King Hussein Bin Talal Convention Centre, Dead Sea, Jordan, on 22 June 2018. The couple's first child, a son named Talal, was born on 27 March 2019. Their second child, a son named Abdullah, was born on 20 December 2020.

Honours

National Honours
 Jordan:
 Grand Cordon of the Order of the Star of Jordan

Foreign Honours
 Netherlands:
 Dame Grand Cross of the Order of Orange-Nassau (30.10.2006)

References

1982 births
Emerson College alumni
House of Hashim
Jordanian people of Iranian descent
Jordanian princesses
Knights Grand Cross of the Order of Orange-Nassau
Living people
People from Amman